Adrien Lebeau (born 8 July 1999) is a French professional footballer who plays as a midfielder for Waldhof Mannheim.

Club career
On 28 May 2019, Lebeau signed his first professional contract with Strasbourg. He made his professional debut with Strasbourg in a 2–0 Ligue 1 loss to Rennes on 25 August 2019.

Lebeau joined 3. Liga club Waldhof Mannheim in August 2021.

References

External links
 
 Racing Profile
 

1999 births
Living people
Footballers from Metz
Association football midfielders
French footballers
RC Strasbourg Alsace players
SV Waldhof Mannheim players
Ligue 1 players
Championnat National 3 players
French expatriate footballers
French expatriate sportspeople in Germany
Expatriate footballers in Germany